Cao Xinlong (born 16 August 1981) is a former professional snooker player from the People's Republic of China.

Cao turned professional in 2013 after finished fourth highest ranked amateur on the APTC Order of Merit, winning a tour card for 2013–14 and 2014–15 seasons.

Career

2013/14 season
Cao's best performances during the debut season came at the Asian Tour events where he reached last 32 stage twice. Elsewhere he was to struggle, winning just two matches in the full ranking tournaments. He finished the season ranked 115.

2014/2015 season
Cao failed to win a match in any ranking event qualifier or European Tour event during the 2014–15 season. His only victories came on the Asian Tour where two last 32 exits out of the three events saw him placed 30th on the Order of Merit. Cao dropped off the tour at the end of the season as he was the world number 112.

Performance and rankings timeline

References

External links

Chinese snooker players
Living people
1981 births
21st-century Chinese people